Pratikshya is a 2022 Indian Odia language film, produced & directed by Anupam Patnaik. The film is written by Roshan Bisoi and inspired from a short story, Bapa written by Gourahari Das. Ankesh Anand, Ashish Pradhan and Bivash Rath being the music composer of the film, the cinematography is being handled by Deepak Kumar. Anupam Kher announced to produce and act in its Hindi remake.

The film follows the journey of Sanjay a middle-class unemployed youth whose only goal is to get a Government job. Life throws a curveball at him when his father suddenly becomes ill. With no job & money, he struggles to stay afloat with his inner desires.

Plot 
Set in Bhubaneswar around a typical middle-class family, Pratikshya is a story about dreams, desperation, and aspirations. Like every unemployed graduate, Sanjay is adamant about finding a government job. Bipin, his father tries hard to convince Sanjay to do any job as his retirement is at bay. The family is already burdened with loans taken for Sanjay's elder sisters Supriya's wedding. The buck stops when Bipin is diagnosed with a terminal illness and Sanjay faces the dilemma of securing a government job and saving his father.

Cast
 Dipanwit Dashmohapatra plays the role of the son/unemployed youth; Sanjay, who is burdened with dreams and desires of proving himself before the world.
 Choudhury Jayaprakash Das made his appearance as the father of the protagonist Sanjay. A principled government employee who is hopeful that his son would carry the baton from him of middle-class desires.
 Barsha Patnaik, who is a state film award-winning actress, portrays the character of Kalyani, Sanjay's girlfriend. Unlike Sanjay, Kalyani has everything going right in her life. she has a stable job with a handsome salary. She depicts the other half of the country; A clear contrast which has shown in the film.
 Sreela Tripathy plays Sanjay's mother. After the family met with a crisis she is the only one who gives assurance to his son that everything will fall into place.
 Sidhant Mohapatra (guest appearance)  as a doctor who comes into the movie at a very crucial point plays the vital character.
 Roshan Bisoi, the writer of the film plays the role of a friend (Bijit). Bijit will do anything to get a job and has no ethical values. For him, the shortest way to reach your desired goal is by making your hands dirty. Sanjay envies him as he becomes the first one in their group to get a job by bribing the superior officer.
 Roopambika Nayak
 Susil Mishra
 Abakash Mishra

Release

Festival screening
Pratikshya was screened in Indian Panorama section of IFFI 2022 and has won the Best Story Feature Film Award at the Washington DC South Asia Film Festival (DCSAFF) 2022.

Reception
Pratikshya released on 2 December 2022.
Mostly it has garnered positive reviews among critics. Anupam Kher has announced its Hindi remake in IFFI press conference.

References

2020s Odia-language films
2022 films